James Boggs (May 27, 1919 – July 22, 1993) was an American political activist, auto worker and author. He was married to philosopher  activist Grace Lee Boggs for forty years until his death.

Biography

Born in 1919 in Marion Junction, Alabama, Boggs was an African-American activist, perhaps best known for authoring The American Revolution: Pages from a Negro Worker's Notebook in 1963. He was also an auto worker at Chrysler from 1940 until 1968.

Boggs was active in the revolutionary left organization, Correspondence Publishing Committee, from around the time it left the Trotskyist movement in the early 1950s. The group was advised by C. L. R. James, who was at that time exiled in Britain. In 1955, James Boggs became the editor of their bi-monthly publication, called Correspondence. When Correspondence Publishing Committee suffered a split in 1955, led by Raya Dunayevskaya, and lost nearly half its membership, James and Grace Lee Boggs remained loyal to Correspondence Publishing Committee.  However, in 1962, Boggs and Grace Lee Boggs led a split themselves, taking control over Correspondence Publishing Committee and breaking with C. L. R. James. Afterwards, Boggs continued publication of Correspondence independently for a couple of years. James Boggs expressed the reasons for the 1962 split in his 1963 book, The American Revolution: Pages from a Negro Worker's Notebook.

In later years, he would play an influential role in the radical wing of the civil rights movement and interacted with many of the most important civil rights activists of the day including Malcolm X, Ossie Davis and many others.

In 1979 James Boggs and partner Grace Lee Boggs contributed to the founding of National Organization for an American Revolution (NOAR).

Boggs and Grace Lee Boggs, who were married from 1953 until his death in 1993, built what Ibram X. Kendi called "a durable partnership that was at once marital, intellectual, and political. It was a genuine partnership of equals, remarkable not only for its unique pairing or for its longevity, but also for its capacity to continually generate theoretical reflection and modes of activist engagement."

Works
 The American Revolution: Pages from a Negro Worker's Notebook (New York: Monthly Review Press, 1963).
 Book Manifesto for a Black revolutionary party (Philadelphia, Pacesetters Pub. House, 1969).
 Racism and the Class Struggle: Further Pages from a Black Worker's Notebook (New York: Monthly Review Press, 1970).
 Lenin Today; Eight essays on the hundredth anniversary of Lenin's birth (New York: Monthly Review Press, 1970). (with Paul Sweezy and Harry Magdoff)
 The awesome responsibilities of revolutionary leadership (Detroit, Mich: Committee for Political Development, 1970). (with Grace Lee Boggs)
 But what about the workers? (Detroit: Advocators, 1973). (with James Hocker)
 Revolution and Evolution in the Twentieth Century (New York: Monthly Review Press, 1974). (with Grace Lee Boggs)
 Issues in race and ethnic relations: theory, research, and action (Itasca, Ill: F. E. Peacock Publishers, 1977). (with Jack Rothman)
 Conversations in Maine: exploring our nation's future (Boston: South End Press, 1978). (with Grace Lee Boggs, Freddy Paine and Lyman Paine)
 Towards a new concept of citizenship (Detroit: National Organization for an American Revolution, 1979).
 Liberation or Revolution? (Detroit: National Organization for an American Revolution, 1980).
 These are the times that try our souls: the questions we have yet to ask ourselves (Detroit: National Organization for an American Revolution, 1981).(with Grace Lee Boggs and James Hocker)
 Historical development of our social forces (Detroit: National Organization for an American Revolution, 1982) "Cadre Training School, Dec. 1-5, 1982."
 Our American Reality (Detroit: National Organization for an American Revolution, 1982) "Cadre Training School, Dec. 1-5, 1982."
 The urgent plea: a call for Black leadership (Philadelphia: National Organization for an American Revolution, 1985).
 What can we be that our children see? (Detroit: New Life Publishers, 1994).

See also 
 History of African Americans in Detroit

References 

 Paul Buhle, "An Asian-American Tale" Monthly Review (January 1999), pp. 47–50.
 Grace Lee Boggs, Living for Change: An Autobiography (Minneapolis: University of Minnesota Press, 1998).
 Kent Worcester, C.L.R. James: A Political Biography (Albany: State University of New York Press, 1996).
 Elaine Latzman Moon, Untold Tales, Unsung Heroes: An Oral History of Detroit's African American Community (Detroit: Wayne State University Press), p. 156.

Further reading 
 James and Grace Lee Boggs Papers Papers, 1930s-1993, Walter P. Reuther Library, Archives of Labor and Urban Affairs, Wayne State University.
 Stephen M. Ward, In Love and Struggle: The Revolutionary Lives of James and Grace Lee Boggs (Justice, Power, and Politics), The University of North Carolina Press, 2016. .

External links
 The Boggs Center Home Page

1919 births
1993 deaths
20th-century American writers
People from Dallas County, Alabama
Activists for African-American civil rights
Activists from Alabama
Alabama socialists
American socialists
American Marxists
African-American Marxists
Michigan socialists
Writers from Alabama